The 1986 Columbia Lions football team was an American football team that represented Columbia University during the 1986 NCAA Division I-AA football season. Amid a record-setting loss streak, Columbia finished last in the Ivy League. 

In their first season under head coach Larry McElreavy, the Lions compiled an 0–10 record and were outscored 379 to 91. Chris Riga was the team captain.  

The Lions' winless (0–7) conference record was the worst in the Ivy League standings. Columbia was outscored 257 to 28 by Ivy opponents. 

By losing all of their games in 1986, the Lions extended a winless streak and a losing streak that began in 1983. They would not win or tie another game until October 9, 1988, against Princeton, an NCAA Division I record streak at the time. At the end of 1986, the streak stood at 34 games without a win, and 31 straight losses. 

Columbia played its homes games at Lawrence A. Wien Stadium in Upper Manhattan, in New York City.

Schedule

References

Columbia
Columbia Lions football seasons
College football winless seasons
Columbia Lions football